Maungatapu is a suburb and peninsula of Tauranga in the Bay of Plenty region of New Zealand's North Island. It is north-east of Hairini and south-east of Matapihi.

The Maungatapu Peninsula and Matapihi Peninsula are connected by the Maungatapu Bridge. State Highway 29A runs through both suburbs.

The local Opopoti Marae and Wairakewa meeting house is a meeting place for the Ngāi Te Rangi hapū of Ngāti He.

Demographics

Maungatapu had a population of 2,892 at the 2018 New Zealand census, an increase of 216 people (8.1%) since the 2013 census, and an increase of 267 people (10.2%) since the 2006 census. There were 1,068 households, comprising 1,386 males and 1,509 females, giving a sex ratio of 0.92 males per female. The median age was 43.2 years (compared with 37.4 years nationally), with 555 people (19.2%) aged under 15 years, 486 (16.8%) aged 15 to 29, 1,245 (43.0%) aged 30 to 64, and 606 (21.0%) aged 65 or older.

Ethnicities were 79.0% European/Pākehā, 25.1% Māori, 2.9% Pacific peoples, 5.4% Asian, and 1.0% other ethnicities. People may identify with more than one ethnicity.

The percentage of people born overseas was 17.0, compared with 27.1% nationally.

Although some people chose not to answer the census's question about religious affiliation, 49.0% had no religion, 35.6% were Christian, 6.3% had Māori religious beliefs, 0.8% were Hindu, 0.2% were Muslim, 0.5% were Buddhist and 2.0% had other religions.

Of those at least 15 years old, 411 (17.6%) people had a bachelor's or higher degree, and 405 (17.3%) people had no formal qualifications. The median income was $33,000, compared with $31,800 nationally. 345 people (14.8%) earned over $70,000 compared to 17.2% nationally. The employment status of those at least 15 was that 1,128 (48.3%) people were employed full-time, 348 (14.9%) were part-time, and 69 (3.0%) were unemployed.

Education

References

Suburbs of Tauranga
Populated places around the Tauranga Harbour